Ailsa Chang is an American journalist for National Public Radio (NPR) and a host on All Things Considered. Previously, she covered the United States Congress for NPR. Prior to joining NPR in 2012, Chang was an investigative journalist at NPR member station WNYC in New York City. Since starting as a radio reporter in 2009, she has received numerous national awards for investigative reporting.

Early life and education 
Chang is of Taiwanese heritage. Raised in the San Francisco Bay Area, she earned a Bachelor of Arts degree in public policy from Stanford University. She earned a master's degree in media law from University of Oxford and a master's degree in journalism from Columbia University. She also holds a Juris Doctor from Stanford Law School.

Career 
Chang served as law clerk to John T. Noonan, Jr., a judge of the United States Court of Appeals for the Ninth Circuit.

After five years in law, Chang joined NPR in 2008 as a Kroc fellow in Washington D.C., where she wrote an investigative report into the public defender system of Detroit. The piece, which aired on NPR in 2009, was awarded the 2010 Daniel Schorr Journalism Prize.

She was also a reporter for KQED public radio in San Francisco, before joining WNYC radio. Chang joined WNYC radio in 2009, where she covered criminal justice, terrorism and the courts. At WNYC, Chang wrote an investigative report into "stop-and-frisk" search policies of New York City Police Department. The series, which aired on NPR in 2011, earned her a silver baton in the 2012 Alfred I. duPont–Columbia University Awards.

Chang returned to NPR in 2012. She was formerly a correspondent for Planet Money. Previously, she reported on U.S. Congress activities, specifically immigration, healthcare and gun control. On Jan. 1, 2018 she assumed co-chair—with Ari Shapiro, Audie Cornish, and Kelly McEvers—on the afternoon series All Things Considered. Chang has also appeared as a guest on PBS NewsHour and other television programs for her legal reporting.

Awards 
 2001: Irvine Hellman, Jr. Special Award
2011: Art Athens Award for General Excellence in Individual Reporting for radio
2012: Alfred I. duPont–Columbia University Awards, Silver Baton
2015: National Journalism Award from the Asian American Journalists Association for coverage of Capitol Hill

References

External links
Staff page at NPR
Staff page at WNYC

American investigative journalists
American women journalists
Women radio journalists
NPR personalities
Stanford University alumni
Stanford Law School alumni
Living people
Year of birth missing (living people)
21st-century American women
American people of Taiwanese descent